Kolajan or Kolajen may refer to:
 Kolajan-e Qajar
 Kolajan-e Sadat